The 1996 Supercoppa Italiana was a match played by the 1995–96 Serie A winners Milan and 1995–96 Coppa Italia winners Fiorentina. It took place on 25 August 1996 at the San Siro in Milan, Italy. Fiorentina won the match 2–1 to earn their first and to date only Supercoppa.

Match details

1996
Supercoppa 1996
Supercoppa 1996
Supercoppa Italiana